The 2007 Victory Bowl was a college football bowl game.  It was a part of the 2007 football season and was played at Reeves Field in Beaver Falls, Pennsylvania.  The game placed the Malone Pioneers against the Geneva College Golden Tornadoes.

Malone won the game by a score of 45 to 17.  A strong showing in the second quarter of 31 points by the Pioneers helped to secure the win and was assisted by four turnovers.   The game was the second bowl appearance for both the Pioneers and Malone coach Mike Gardner, as well as the first bowl game victory for both.

Malone produced 521 yards of total offense while holding Geneva to 293.  Malone managed six touchdowns in the game (three rushing and three passing) and scored a total of 31 points in the second quarter alone.  Malone's defense brought in two interceptions and recovered three fumbles.

References

Victory Bowl
Victory Bowl
Victory Bowl
Geneva Golden Tornadoes football bowl games
Malone Pioneers football bowl games
Victory Bowl
Victory Bowl